William H. Maxwell Career and Technical High School is a vocational high school in Brooklyn, New York. The building was built in 1912, but it was re-chartered as a high school in 1950. The school offers vocational training in a variety of subjects, including cosmetology, fashion, medical assisting and related visual instruction.

References

External links

NYC Department of Education: W. H. Maxwell Career and Technical Education High School

Public high schools in Brooklyn
East New York, Brooklyn